Argonaute was a 74-gun ship of the line of the French Navy.

Under Vice-amiral Villaret de Joyeuse, she took part in the expedition to Saint-Domingue in 1802. She took part in the Battle of Trafalgar in October 1805, and managed to return to Cádiz. She was renamed Argonauta, but was never recommissioned.

See also 
 Jacques Bedout
 List of ships of the line of France

References

Ships of the line of the French Navy
Téméraire-class ships of the line
1798 ships
Ships built in France